The 2021 NCAA Skiing Championships took place from March 10 to March 13 in New Hampshire, at Jackson Nordic Ski Area, which hosted the cross-country events, and Cannon Mountain Ski Area, which hosted the alpine events. The tournament went into its 67th consecutive NCAA Skiing Championships, and featured seventeen teams across all divisions.

Team results

 Note: Top 10 only
 (H): Team from hosting U.S. state

Individual Results

 Note: Table does not include consolation
 (H): Individual from hosting U.S. State

References

2021 in American sports
2021 in sports in New Hampshire